It's You I Have Loved is a 1929 German drama film directed by Rudolf Walther-Fein and starring Mady Christians, Walter Jankuhn, and Hans Stüwe. It is considered the first full sound film to be made in Germany (following part-sound films which had been released earlier in the year). When it was released in the United States, the film's plot was compared to that of The Jazz Singer. It is also known as Because I Loved You.

Cast

References

Bibliography

External links

1929 films
Films of the Weimar Republic
1929 drama films
German drama films
1920s German-language films
Films directed by Rudolf Walther-Fein
German black-and-white films
1920s German films